Sarmoli is a village development committee in Darchula District in the Mahakali Zone of western Nepal. At the time of the 1991 Nepal census it had a population of 3979 people living in 733 individual households.

References

External links
UN map of the municipalities of Darchula District

Populated places in Darchula District